Inferno is the eighth studio album by Swedish death metal band Entombed. It was released on 4 August 2003. The album is a continuation of the sound heard on 2001's Morning Star, and combines traditional death metal with death 'n' roll, along with various other elements and influences.

Track listing

In 2004, Inferno was rereleased by Threeman Records and Candlelight Records with a second disc, titled Averno. It contains the following track listing and content:

Personnel
 Lars-Göran Petrov – vocals
 Uffe Cederlund – guitar
 Alex Hellid – guitar
 Jörgen Sandström – bass
 Peter Stjärnvind – drums

References

Entombed (band) albums
2003 albums